Woodsworth College, named after politician and clergyman James Shaver Woodsworth (1874–1942), is a college within the University of Toronto in Canada.  It is one of the largest colleges in the Faculty of Arts and Science at the St. George Campus.  It is also the newest of the colleges at the University of Toronto, created in 1974. Woodsworth College's arms and badge were registered with the Canadian Heraldic Authority on October 15, 2006.

The college was founded to serve part-time students exclusively, specifically adults pursuing studies in Arts and Sciences, and transfer students. Since 1999, Woodsworth has welcomed  direct entry students. Woodsworth College is home to approximately 5300 students.

Woodsworth College Students' Association

The Woodsworth College Students' Association (WCSA) is the representative body of students at the college.

The association's board consists of its president, six vice-presidents, and twenty-four directors.

WCSA organizes events such as orientation (Orientation Week) for first-year students, weekly WCSA Wednesdays, the annual Red Party along with the year-end Woodsworth Gala (Formal). It also provides a great number of services and activities throughout the year.

The office of the WCSA is located at: WW 103, 119 St. George St., Toronto, Ontario, Canada.

International student exchange
In 1972, Woodsworth was administering the Summer Program to Siena, Italy. It was the first destination, followed in 1997 by Hong Kong.

Woodsworth College's Summer Abroad Program sends approximately 900 students to 16 destinations worldwide.  In 2020, the destinations were: Australia, Central Europe, China, Ecuador, England, France, Georgia, Germany, Greece, Ireland, Italy, Portugal, Peru, South Africa, South Korea, Spain and there was a Science Abroad option. In 2021, the program was run virtually. Plans are underway for travel again in the summer of 2022.

The Visiting Student Program
Woodsworth oversees the Visiting Student Program in the Faculty of Arts and Science. This program allows students from other North American universities to come to the University of Toronto and complete credits towards degrees at their home institution.

Student residence

Woodsworth Residence opened in 2004 and was designed by the architectural firm Architects Alliance. The residence, located at 321 Bloor Street West, towers over the Perly-Rae gates at the northern entrance of the St. George Campus.  The building is a 17-storey glass tower housing 371 students.

Prior to the construction in 2004 of the Woodsworth College undergraduate residence, the site at 321 Bloor Street was occupied by the Graduate Student Residence, also known as the St. George Apartments. The four-storey U-shaped residence, built in 1926, was designed by the firm of Paisley & Marani and was in the City of Toronto's Inventory of Heritage Properties.  In 2000, a new residence was built for graduate students at the on Harbord St.

Woodsworth College Residence has a student council (Woodsworth Residence Council) composed of students who live in the residence including floor/house reps.

There are classrooms in the basement of the residence. Some of the courses are offered by the Rotman School of Management and include courses in business law, accounting and finance.

Academic programs at Woodsworth
These programs combine courses from a number of different academic departments in the Faculty of Arts & Science.
 Millie Rotman Shime Academic Bridging Program and the Diploma to Degree Program
 Digital Humanities (Minor program)
 Summer Abroad 
 International Summer Program
 Woodsworth One

Certificate programs 
This program is for students who have already completed an undergraduate degree.
 TESOL (Teaching English to Speakers of Other Languages)

References

Further reading
 Martin L. Friedland 'The University of Toronto: A History' (Toronto: University of Toronto Press © 2002)
 Robin Harris 'A History of University of Toronto' (Toronto: University of Toronto Press © 1970)
 Rick Helmes-Hayes 'Forty Years, 1963-2003: A History of the Department of Sociology, University of Toronto.' (Toronto: Canadian Scholars' Press, 2003, 215 pp.)
 Professor Brian McKillop, 'Matters of Mind: The University in Ontario, 1791-1951'  (Ottawa: University of Ottawa Press 1951)
 Marian Packham '100 Years of Biochemistry at the University of Toronto: An Illustrated History' 1908–2008, (Toronto: University of Toronto Press © 2008)

Colleges of the University of Toronto
University of Toronto buildings